Joseph A. Wallis (December 12, 1837 – May 14, 1917) was an American politician who served as Mayor of Beverly, Massachusetts.

Early life
Wallis was born on December 12, 1837, in Beverly. At the age of 13, he began learning the shoemaking trade from his father. He spent several winters fishing at the Grand Banks of Newfoundland before going into shoe manufacturing full-time. During the American Civil War, Wallis enlisted with an unattached artillery company. The company spent a year at a fort in Gloucester, Massachusetts, but did not see any combat before the war ended.

Business career
In 1867, Wallis and two business partners opened a shoe factory under the firm name Wallis, Kilham & Bray in Beverly. He retired from the business in 1900. He was also a longtime trustee and vice president of the Beverly Savings Bank.

Political career
From 1885 to 1886, Wallis was a member of the Beverly board of selectmen. In 1902 he served on the board of aldermen. From 1905 to 1906 he was Mayor of Beverly. From 1908 to 1909 he represented the 20th Essex District in the Massachusetts House of Representatives.

Later life and death
On October 3, 1916, Wallis was thrown from an automobile during a collision. He was not seriously injured.

Wallis died on May 14, 1917, following several months of illness.

Note
1. The 20th Essex District sent two representatives to the Massachusetts House of Representatives. In 1908, Wallis and William R. Brooks succeeded Melvin B. Putnam and Albert Vittum.

References

1837 births
1917 deaths
Mayors of Beverly, Massachusetts
Republican Party members of the Massachusetts House of Representatives